The Central Command of the Indian Army is one of the seven operational commands of the army. It is based at Lucknow, Uttar Pradesh.

History

Second World War
Central Command was first established in 1942 during World War II and then disbanded in 1946.
Southern Command was responsible for most of the training activities for Indian Army until Central Command was formed in April 1942 which took over the responsibility of some of the training areas.

Post 1962 Indo-China war
With its HQ at Lucknow the Command was re-established on 1 May 1963 due to the Sino-Indian War of 1962. Lt Gen K Bahadur Singh was the first Army Commander of the new Central Command. Prior to that date Lucknow had been the headquarters of the Eastern Command.

Rescue operations during 2013 North India floods
During 2013 North India floods in its rescue operations "Operation Surya Hope" in Uttarakhand, the Central Command mobilised over 8,000 troops for rescue and relief operations for stranded people on all four different axis of Rishikesh-Uttarkashi-Harsil-Gangotri axis, Rudraprayag-Kedarnath axis, Joshimath-Badrinath axis and Dharchula-Tawaghat axis in Pithoragarh district. Under operation Ganga, the Army evacuated 1,150 persons from Harsil area; 6,000 from Joshimath and 700 from Tawaghat area. Army operations in the 40,000 square kilometres were led by Lieutenant General Anil Chait, General Officer Commanding-in-Chief, Central Command.

Structure
Central Command's Area Of Responsibility (AOR) covers eight states of India:Uttar Pradesh, Uttarakhand, Himachal Pradesh, Madhya Pradesh, Chhattisgarh, Bihar, Jharkhand and Odisha. 18 Regimental Centres and a large number of logistic and training establishments come under Central Command.  The responsibility for the central sector of the Western border with Pakistan also lies with Central Command. Almost half of the 62 cantonments in India lie within the Central Command's theatre.

There are two Static Area Formations:- Uttar Bharat Area and Madhya Bharat Area. Central Command earlier used to act as strategic reserve but now it is looking after Uttarakhand sector of Sino-Indian border.

Precursors
Following is the list of precursors to the Western Command and their commanders:

Central Command (1942–1946)

List of GOC-in-C of Central Command (1963–present)

See also 
Operation Surya Hope

References

External links
 Central Command @ globalsecurity.org

Commands of the Indian Army